Barry Aldag (born c. 1945) is a former Canadian football offensive lineman and defensive tackle who played for the Saskatchewan Roughriders of the Canadian Football League. From 1968 to 1971, he played in 51 regular season games and recovered three fumbles.

References 

1945 births
Living people
Canadian football offensive linemen
Canadian football defensive linemen
Regina Rams players
Saskatchewan Roughriders players